is the 25th single by the Japanese J-pop group Every Little Thing, released on July 30, 2003.

Track listing
  (Words - Kaori Mochida / music - Kunio Tago)
 nostalgia (2003614 version) (Words - Kaori Mochida / music - Kazuhito Kikuchi)
  (instrumental)

Chart positions

External links
  information at Avex Network.
  information at Oricon.

2003 singles
Every Little Thing (band) songs
Songs written by Kaori Mochida
2003 songs